The 31st Genie Awards ceremony was held on March 10, 2011 to honour films released in 2010. Nominations were announced on February 2, 2011.

William Shatner was announced as the ceremony's host on February 16.

Winners and nominees

References

External links 
31st Genie Awards at IMDb

Genie Awards
Genie Awards
Genie Awards